Diligence was a Spanish prize that British owners acquired in 1799. She initially traded as a West Indiaman. Then in 1801–1802 she made one complete voyage as a slave ship in the triangular trade in enslaved people. On her second voyage as a slaver, the French captured her in 1804 before she had embarked any slaves.

Career
Diligence first appeared in the Register of Shipping in 1800.<ref name=RS1800>[https://hdl.handle.net/2027/mdp.39015021233591?urlappend=%3Bseq=103 '"RS (1800), "D" supple.]</ref>

Captain E. Higgins sailed from London on 2 October 1801. Diligence arrived at St Vincent in June 1802.

Captain Thomas Boland sailed from London on 4 October 1803.

In April 1804, Lloyd's List reported that that the French had captured Diligence'', Bowland, master, had taken her into Gorée. She had been on her way from London to Africa. 

In 1804, 30 British slave vessels were lost; six were captured on their way to Africa. During the period 1793 to 18047, war, rather than maritime hazards or slave resistance was the greatest cause of vessel losses among British slave vessels.

Notes

Citations

References
 
 

Ships built in Spain
1799 ships
Age of Sail merchant ships of England
London slave ships
Captured ships